Trendelenburg gait, named after Friedrich Trendelenburg, is an abnormal gait. It is caused by weakness or ineffective action of the gluteus medius muscle and the gluteus minimus muscle.

Gandbhir and Rayi point out that the biomechanical action involved comprises a Class 3 lever, where the lower limb's weight is the load, the hip joint is the fulcrum, and the lateral glutei, which attach to the antero-lateral surface of the greater trochanter of the femur, provide the effort. The causes can thus be categorized systematically as failures of this lever system at various points.

Signs and symptoms

During the stance phase, or when standing on one leg, the weakened abductor muscles allow the pelvis to tilt down on the opposite side. To compensate, the trunk lurches to the weakened side to attempt to maintain a level pelvis throughout the gait cycle. When the hip abductor muscles (gluteus medius and minimus) are weak or ineffective, the stabilizing effect of these muscles during gait is lost.

When standing on the right leg, if the left hip drops, it is a positive right Trendelenburg sign (the opposite side drops because the hip abductors on the right side do not stabilize the pelvis to prevent the droop). When the patient walks, if he swings his body to the right to compensate for left hip drop, he will present with a compensated Trendelenburg gait. The patient exhibits an excessive lean in which the upper body is thrust to the right to keep the center of gravity over the stance leg.

Causes
Trendelenburg gait is caused by weakness or ineffective action of the abductor muscles of the lower limb, the gluteus medius muscle and the gluteus minimus muscle.
 Damage to the motor nerve supply of the lateral gluteal muscles (gluteus medius muscle and gluteus minimus muscle)
 Polio involving L5 (foot drop may also be seen because L5 innervates the tibialis anterior muscle).
 Damage to the superior gluteal nerve.
 Temporary or permanent weakness of the lateral glutei
 Tendinitis.
 Penetrating injury.
 Infection, abscess – blood borne, post-traumatic or post-surgical.
 Ineffective action (insufficient leverage) of the lateral glutei
 Greater trochanteric avulsion.
 Fracture, (or non-union) of the femoral neck.
 Coxa Vara (the angle between the femoral neck head and shaft is less than 120 degrees).
 Damage to the hip joint (fulcrum) - Chronic or Developmental Hip Dislocation/Dysplasia
 Osteonecrosis.
 Legg-Calve-Perthes disease.
 Developmental dysplasia.
 Chronic infection.
 Uncorrected traumatic dislocation.

Treatment
Treatment is directed at the underlying cause. In addition, biofeedback and physical therapy are used to strengthen the muscles.

History 
Trendelenburg gait was first described by Friedrich Trendelenburg in 1895.

See also
 Friedrich Trendelenburg
 Gait abnormality
 Gluteal gait
 Snapping hip syndrome
 Trendelenburg position
 Trendelenburg's sign

References

 Wheeless' textbook of orthopaedics 
 Ropper and Brown, Adams and Victor's Principles of Neurology, 8th edition (2005), p. 105

External links 

Gait abnormalities